Mong Kung, Mongkung, Mongkaung or Möngkung is a town in Shan State some 100 kilometres east of Mandalay. It is the capital of Mong Kung Township, Myanmar.

History
In British Burma Mong Kung was the capital of Mongkung State of the Southern Shan States, with an area of 1,642'75 square miles. It was bounded on the north by Hsi Paw; on the east by Mong Tung, Kehsi Mansam and Mong Nawng; on the south by Lai Hka; and on the west by the western range of the Shan Hills and Lawk Sawk.

Mong Kung has had a turbulent and unstable history. It was described by Sir Charles Haukes Todd during the colonial period as: ...a State blessed with very fertile soil and good streams. But here also local dissension and Burman interference had brought ruin.

More recently the area has been ravaged by conflicts between the Shan State Army-South (SSA-S) and the Burmese Army.

References

External links
 "Mongkaung Township - Shan State" Map, 14 June 2010, Myanmar Information Management Unit (MIMU)
Rinderpest in Burma statistics

Populated places in Shan State
Township capitals of Myanmar